Axpe is a railway station in Busturia, Basque Country, Spain. It is owned by Euskal Trenbide Sarea and operated by Euskotren. It lies on the Urdaibai line.

History 
The station opened, together with the rest of the -Pedernales extension of the Amorebieta-Gernika line, on 15 March 1893. The current station building dates from 1943. Built in the neo-Basque style, it is very similar to the former Retana station, built around the same time.

Services 
The station is served by Euskotren Trena line E4. It runs every 30 minutes (in each direction) during weekdays, and every hour during weekends.

References 

Euskotren Trena stations
Railway stations in Biscay
Railway stations in Spain opened in 1893